The Frazer Nash Le Mans Replica, and its evolution, the Frazer Nash Le Mans Replica Mk2, is a sports car, designed, developed and built by British manufacturer Frazer Nash, between 1949 and 1954.

References

Sports cars
Cars of England
1940s cars
1950s cars